Katelin Petersen is an American actress, writer, and producer. She played the young Annika Hansen before she becomes Seven of Nine on an episode of Star Trek: Voyager.

She wrote, directed and appeared in a short film, "Annabelle's Box," a horror story. A rough edit was released on YouTube in 2016.

Filmography
Celebrity guest star on Robot Chicken.

 My Neighbor Totoro (1988)
 Angel on Abbey Street (1999) as Lizbeth
 The Next Best Thing (2000) as Kid #4
 Cahoots (2001) as Cassie
 Where the Heart Is (2000)
 Wuthering Heights (2003)
 Two and a Half Men (2003) as Katie
 Charlie Bartlett (2007)

References

External links

1989 births
Living people
American child actresses
American television actresses
Actresses from Los Angeles
21st-century American women